Thrumpton Hall is an English country house in the village of Thrumpton near Nottingham. It operated as a wedding venue until November 2020.

History

This historic house incorporates a substantial part of an older house which was occupied by the Roman Catholic Powdrell family who were evicted following the Babington Plot.

The main part of the Hall dates from the early part of the seventeenth century and was built by the Pigot family in rose-coloured brick. it was largely complete by 1617.

In the 1660s it was altered and improved by his son Gervase Pigot. There were late eighteenth century alterations made for John Wescomb Emerton, further changes c.1830 for John Emerton Wescomb. Later, it passed into the hands of the Byron family for a hundred years; Byron's daughter, Ada, visited her relations at the Hall from her mother's home at Kirkby Mallory, and during visits to Newstead Abbey, which had passed out of Byron ownership.

Owners
Powdrill or Powdrell family
Gervase Pigot 
Gervase Pigot (son) ??? - 1685
John Emerton 1685 - 1745
John Wescomb Emerton 1745 -  1823
John Emerton Wescomb 1823 - 1838
Rev William Wescomb
George Byron, 8th Baron Byron ???? – 1870 who had, in 1843, married Lucy Wescomb, the daughter of the Rev. William Wescomb, the last of his family in the male line to own Thrumpton. 
George Byron, 9th Baron Byron 1870 - 1917 who had no children, so the estate once more went 'sideways' to his brother  
Frederick Byron, 10th Baron Byron 1917 - 1949, Vicar of Langford in Essex and while, as it were, 'in waiting' was Vicar of Thrumpton in 1914, succeeding his brother and so becoming 'Squarson' of the estate three years later. The 10th Lord married Lady Anna FitzRoy, sister of the 10th Duke of Grafton.
George Fitzroy Seymour 1949 - 1994 (the son of Lady Byron's sister Lady Victoria Seymour (née FitzRoy) and a member of the family of the Marquess of Hertford) and his wife Rosemary, youngest sister of John Scott-Ellis, 9th Baron Howard de Walden
Miranda Seymour 1994 - current.

Features
It contains a library, a medieval kitchen, a  double cube reception room, baronial hall, and a priest hole. It also hosts a collection of portraits, furniture and needlework, as well as various relics of the poet Lord Byron, whose descendants lived at Thrumpton.

Thrumpton Hall is renowned for its cantilever Jacobean staircase, carved in wood from the estate. This was added to the earlier house by the Pigot family, and shows their coat of arms and that of the former Powdrell owners. The staircase was supervised by John Webb, a pupil of Inigo Jones.

References

External links

Thrumpton Hall history
Information about Weddings at Thrumpton Hall

Country houses in Nottinghamshire
Grade I listed buildings in Nottinghamshire